The Spanish Mosque (also known as Masjid Iqbal Ud Daula or Jam e Masjid "Aiwan-E-Begumpet", is a mosque within the Paigah Palace, Begumpet, Hyderabad, India.

The construction of the mosque was started by the fifth Paigah Amir, H.E. Nawab Mohammed Fazaluddin Khan, Iqbal Ud Daula, Sir Viqar-ul-Umra in 1900 (due to his sudden demise in 1902) and completed by his heir and elder son H.E Nawab Sultan Ul Mulk Bahadur, VI Amir of Paigah through Princess Jahandarunissa Begum, Lady Vicar Ul Umra, After his return from Spain, as he was very much inspired by the Cathedral–Mosque of Córdoba. The exterior and interior of the Spanish Mosque are mostly similar to the Cathedral–Mosque of Córdoba in Spain and Jama Masjid Gulbarga, Karnataka, India. It shows state-of-the-art interiors and architecture.

It is also known as the Mosque of the Moors, due to its unique Hispanic (Moorish) style of architecture and is said to be one-of-its-kind in India. The stand-out feature is the spires instead of the usual minarets or domes; they give this mosque a church-like appearance.
Right for the inception this mosque is maintained and managed by the heirs of Paigah Amir Sir Viqar-ul-Umra.

History and features

The mosque is also known by the local Muslim community as Masjid Iqbal Ud-Daula, Masjid Aiwan-e-Begumpet. It can accommodate 3000 worshipers at once. The Spanish Mosque is very well known and is considered as a landmark mosque for the Secunderabad Muslim community. The Mosque is maintained by the Trustee of the mosque and a part of the Paigah family, Mr. Faiz Khan.

Conservation
The Spanish Mosque is a declared heritage site by ASI and is under discussion for the consideration of UNESCO Asia Pacific Merit.

See also
 List of former mosques in Spain
 Heritage Structures of Hyderabad
 Toli Masjid

References

External links

 The Wondrous Spanish Mosque of Hyderabad
 
 
 

Mosques completed in 1906
Mosques in Hyderabad, India
Heritage structures in Hyderabad, India
Hyderabad State
1906 establishments in India